The 1988 Constitution Alteration (Parliamentary Terms) , was an unsuccessful proposal put to referendum in the 1988 Australian referendum on 3 September 1988. It proposed to alter the Australian constitution so that both the House of Representatives and the Senate would be elected for a term of four years. This involved reducing the terms of the Senate from six years to four years, and increasing the terms of the House of Representatives from three years to four years. It also proposed for the fourth time that Senate and House elections occur simultaneously.

Question
A Proposed Law: To alter the Constitution to provide for 4 year maximum terms for members of both Houses of the Commonwealth Parliament.

Do you approve this proposed alteration?

The proposal was to alter sections of the Constitution to read as follows:
7. The Senate
The Senate shall be composed of senators for each State, directly chosen by the people of the State, voting, until the Parliament otherwise provides, as one electorate.
But until the Parliament of the Commonwealth otherwise provides, the Parliament of the State of Queensland, if that State be an Original State, may make laws dividing the State into divisions and determining the number of senators to be chosen for each division, and in the absence of such provision the State shall be one electorate.
Until the Parliament otherwise provides there shall be six senators for each Original State. The Parliament may make laws increasing or diminishing the number of senators for each State, but so that equal representation of the several Original States shall be maintained and that no Original State shall have less than six senators.
The senators shall be chosen for a term of six years, and the names of the senators chosen for each State shall be certified by the Governor to the Governor-General. 
9. Method of election of senators
The Parliament of the Commonwealth may make laws prescribing the method of choosing senators, but so that the method shall be uniform for all the States. Subject to any such law, the Parliament of each State may make laws prescribing the method of choosing the senators for that State.
Times and places
The Parliament of a State may make laws for determining the times and places of elections of senators for the State. 
12. Issue of writs
The Governor of any State may cause writs to be issued for elections of senators for the State. In case of the dissolution of the Senate the writs shall be issued within ten days from the proclamation of such dissolution. The writs shall be issued within ten days from the expiry of a House of Representatives or from the proclamation of a dissolution thereof, but so that the polling day shall be the same day as the polling day for the election of members of the House of Representatives. 
13. Rotation of senators
As soon as may be after the Senate first meets, and after each first meeting of the Senate following a dissolution thereof, the Senate shall divide the senators chosen for each State into two classes, as nearly equal in number as practicable; and the places of the senators of the first class shall become vacant at the expiration of three years, and the places of those of the second class at the expiration of six years, from the beginning of their term of service; and afterwards the places of senators shall become vacant at the expiration of six years from the beginning of their term of service.
The election to fill vacant places shall be made within one year before the places are to become vacant.
For the purposes of this section the term of service of a senator shall be taken to begin on the first day of July following the day of his election, except in the cases of the first election and of the election next after any dissolution of the Senate, when it shall be taken to begin on the first day of July preceding the day of his election.
14. Further provision for rotation
Whenever the number of senators for a State is increased or diminished, the Parliament of the Commonwealth may make such provision for the vacating of the places of senators for the State as it deems necessary to maintain regularity in the rotation.
13. Terms of service of senators.
(1) The terms of service of senators expire upon the expiry or dissolution of the House of Representatives.
(2) Subsection (1) applies in relation to the term of service of any senator, including:
(a) a  senator holding office at the commencement of this section; and
(b) a senator chosen or appointed after that commencement in consequence of a  vacancy existing at that commencement;
but, in the case of a  senator appointed by the Governor of a  State, this section does not extend the term of the appointment after the expiration of 20 fourteen days from the beginning of the next session of the Parliament of the State following the making of the appointment.
28. Duration of House of Representatives
Every House of Representatives shall continue for three years four years from the first meeting of the House, and no longer, but may be sooner dissolved by the Governor-General.
In relation to a  House of Representatives whose first meeting occurred before the commencement of the Constitution Alteration (Parliamentary Terms) 1988, the last preceding paragraph has effect as if the reference to four years were a  reference to three years.

Result
The referendum was not approved by a majority of voters, and a majority of the voters was not achieved in any state.

Discussion
This was the fourth unsuccessful referendum that sought to require simultaneous elections of the House of Representatives and the Senate.

See also
Politics of Australia
History of Australia

References

Further reading
  
 
 Australian Electoral Commission (2007) Referendum Dates and Results 1906 – Present AEC, Canberra.

1988 referendums
Referendum (Parliamentary Terms)
1988 (Parliamentary Terms)
Proposed laws of Australia